Anne, Princess Royal, has received numerous titles, decorations, and honorary appointments as a member of the British royal family and the sister of King Charles III of the United Kingdom and the other Commonwealth realms. Each is listed below; where two dates are shown, the first indicates the date of receiving the title or award (the title as Princess Anne of Edinburgh being given as from her birth) and the second indicates the date of its loss or renunciation.

Royal and noble titles and styles

 15 August 1950 – 6 February 1952: Her Royal Highness Princess Anne of Edinburgh
 6 February 1952 – 15 November 1973: Her Royal Highness The Princess Anne
 15 November 1973 – 13 June 1987: Her Royal Highness The Princess Anne, Mrs Mark Phillips
 13 June 1987 – present: Her Royal Highness The Princess Royal

From birth, thanks to letters patent issued by her grandfather, George VI on 22 October 1948, Anne was a British princess with the style of Royal Highness and the territorial designation "of Edinburgh". Upon her mother's accession to the throne in 1952, the territorial designation was dropped and she became styled as "The Princess Anne". After she married Captain Mark Phillips in 1973, she was styled as "The Princess Anne, Mrs Mark Phillips" until her mother created her Princess Royal, an appellation given only to the eldest daughter of the sovereign, on 13 June 1987. Anne is the seventh Princess Royal since the title was first granted to Mary, daughter of Charles I. The previous holder was Anne's great-aunt, Mary, daughter of George V.

Military ranks

  British Army
 15 August 2020: General
  Royal Navy 
 15 August 1993: Rear Admiral
 15 August 2009: Vice Admiral
 15 August 2012: Admiral
  Royal Air Force 
 15 August 2020: Air Chief Marshal

Commonwealth honours

Appointments (Shown in order in which appointments were made, not order of precedence)

Decorations and medals (Shown in order in which appointments were made, not order of precedence)

Foreign honours
Appointments (Shown in order in which appointments were made, not order of precedence)

Decorations and medals (Shown in order in which appointments were made, not order of precedence)

Honorary military appointments 

 Australia
  1977– : Colonel-in-Chief of the Royal Australian Corps of Signals
  2011– : Colonel-in-Chief of the Royal Australian Corps of Transport

 Canada
  1972– : Colonel-in-Chief of the 8th Canadian Hussars (Princess Louise's)
  1977– : Colonel-in-Chief of the Grey and Simcoe Foresters
  1977– : Colonel-in-Chief of the Communications and Electronics Branch
  1982– : Colonel-in-Chief of The Royal Regina Rifles
  1987– : Colonel-in-Chief of Royal Newfoundland Regiment
  2003– : Colonel-in-Chief of the Royal Canadian Medical Service
  2014– : Colonel-in-Chief of the Royal Canadian Hussars
  2015– : Commodore-in-Chief of the Royal Canadian Navy (Fleet Pacific)
  2017– : Deputy Commissioner of the Royal Canadian Mounted Police

 New Zealand
  1977– : Colonel-in-Chief of the Royal New Zealand Army Nursing Corps
  1977– : Colonel-in-Chief of the Royal New Zealand Corps of Signals

 United Kingdom
  1970–2007 : Colonel-in-Chief of the Worcestershire and Sherwood Foresters Regiment (29/45 Foot)
  1977– : Colonel-in-Chief of the Royal Corps of Signals
  1981– : Commandant-in-Chief of the First Aid Nursing Yeomanry (Princess Royal's Volunteer Corps)
  1983–2006 : Colonel-in-Chief of The Royal Scots (The Royal Regiment)
  1989– : Royal Honorary Colonel of the University of London OTC
  1992– : Colonel-in-Chief of the King's Royal Hussars
  1992– : Colonel-in-Chief of the Royal Logistic Corps
  1993– : Affiliated Colonel-in-Chief of the Queen's Gurkha Signals
  1993– : Affiliated Colonel-in-Chief of the Queen's Own Gurkha Logistic Regiment
  1998– : Colonel of the Blues and Royals (Royal Horse Guards and 1st Dragoons)
  2003– : Colonel-in-Chief of the Royal Army Veterinary Corps
  2006– : Royal Colonel of the Royal Scots Borderers, 1st Battalion Royal Regiment of Scotland
  2006– : Royal Colonel of the 52nd Lowland, 6th Battalion Royal Regiment of Scotland
  2022– : Colonel-in-Chief of the Intelligence Corps
  1977–2011: Honorary Air Commodore of RAF Lyneham
  1993– : Honorary Air Commodore of the University of London Air Squadron
  2011– : Honorary Air Commodore of RAF Brize Norton
  1974–1993: Chief Commandant of the Women's Royal Naval Service
  1993– : Chief Commandant for Women in the Royal Navy
  2006– : Commodore-in-Chief of HMNB Portsmouth
  2021– : Admiral of the Sea Cadet Corps
  1988– : Lady Sponsor of 
  2001– : Lady Sponsor of

Non-national titles and honours

Membership, fellowships and presidencies

Civic

Religious

Academic

Honorary academic degrees

Other appointments

Honorific eponyms

Awards
 : Princess Royal Challenge Cup

Buildings
 : Princess Anne French Immersion Public School, London, Ontario
 : Princess Anne Public School, Sudbury, Ontario
 : Princess Anne Entrance at Rideau Hall, Ottawa, Ontario
 : Princess Anne Community Centre, South Frontenac, Ontario
 : Princess Royal Barracks, RAF Gütersloh, Gütersloh, Germany
 : Princess Anne Hospital, Southampton, Hampshire, England
 : Princess Royal Hospital, Telford, Shropshire, England

Roads
 : Princess Anne Manor, Toronto, Ontario
 : Princess Anne Crescent, Etobicoke, Ontario
 : Princess Royal Drive, Mississauga, Ontario
 : Princess Royal Way, Harrogate, North Yorkshire

Geographical locations
 : Princess Anne Glacier

Miscellaneous 
 46202 Princess Anne
 RV The Princess Royal
 Rosa 'Princess Anne'

See also
 List of titles and honours of Charles III
 List of titles and honours of Queen Camilla
 List of titles and honours of William, Prince of Wales
 List of titles and honours of Catherine, Princess of Wales
 List of titles and honours of Elizabeth II
 List of titles and honours of Prince Philip, Duke of Edinburgh
 List of titles and honours of George VI
 List of titles and honours of Elizabeth Bowes-Lyon
 List of titles and honours of Mary of Teck
 List of titles and honours of Prince Arthur, Duke of Connaught and Strathearn

References

Anne, Princess Royal
Lists of titles by person of the United Kingdom
British monarchy-related lists
Commonwealth royal styles

Dames Grand Cross of the Royal Victorian Order
Companions of the Queen's Service Order
Dames Grand Cross of the Order of St John
Recipients of the Grand Decoration with Sash for Services to the Republic of Austria
Recipients of the Order of Isabella the Catholic